The 2011 California Golden Bears baseball team represented the University of California, Berkeley in the 2011 NCAA Division I baseball season.  The team played their home games in Evans Diamond. They entered the 2011 season after making the postseason two of the last three years and with a 31–20 record, the Golden Bears won an at-large berth (therefore making the postseason three of the past four years) for the 2011 NCAA Division I baseball tournament, and were seeded #3 in the Houston. The Golden Bears lost the first game of the double-elimination format to the Baylor Bears, 6–4.  California then went on to win their next four games in a row eliminating Alcorn State, #1 seed Rice, and Baylor. With their victory on June 6, the Bears advanced to a Super Regional for the first time since the 64 team format was introduced. California hosted its Super Regional games on June 11 and 12 sweeping Dallas Baptist to advance to the College World Series for the first time since 1992. Although the Bears hosted, the series was not be at Evans Diamond in Berkeley, but at Stephen Schott Stadium in Santa Clara because Cal's stadium was not suitable for large television crews and did not have lights.

Previous season
California finished the 2010 regular season as the #6 team in the Pacific-10 Conference, and was eliminated in two games in the Norman Regional of the 2010 NCAA Division I baseball tournament.

Elimination
Because of the severe budget crisis that was/is facing the entire state of California and the University of California system specifically, on September 28, 2010, University of California, Berkeley Chancellor Robert Birgeneau announced that five intercollegiate sports programs would be eliminated at Cal and the baseball program was one of the five. The decision to cut the sports (other sports were the Men's Gymnastics, Women's Gymnastics, and Women's Lacrosse team along with the demotion of the then 25-time national champion Rugby program) sparked outrage amongst the Berkeley community and alumni and fundraising efforts almost immediately began to save the programs. Due to successful fundraising efforts thanks in part to the baseball program's supporters, three of the five were reinstated on February 11, 2011, however, baseball and men's gymnastics were still slated to end at the end of the 2010–11 academic year. After raising nearly 10 million dollars by the month of April, the chancellor announced the immediate reinstatement of the California Golden Bears baseball team on April 8. The Men's Gymnastics program was reinstated on May 2.

Schedule
The season for California began on Sunday, February 20 with a home game against Utah, opening day was delayed twice due to rain in the San Francisco Bay Area.  Their longest homestand was from March 16–17 (7 home games—originally 8), and their longest road trip was from May 3 through 24 (9 road games).  Their final game of the regular season was on Saturday, May 29 at home against arch-rival Stanford. In 2011, the California Golden Bears baseball team won an at-large berth to the 2011 NCAA Division I Baseball Tournament and advanced to the Super Regionals. California then swept Dallas Baptist in Santa Clara to clinch a berth to the College World Series for the first time since 1992.

|- align="center" bgcolor="#bbbbbb"
|  || February 18 || Utah || colspan=5 |Postponed (rain); Rescheduled for February 19 ||  || 0–0 || Evans Diamond || 
|- align="center" bgcolor="#bbbbbb"
|  || February 19 || Utah || colspan=5 |Cancelled (rain) ||  || 0–0 || Evans Diamond || 
|- align="center" bgcolor="#bbbbbb"
|  || February 19 || Utah || colspan=5 |Postponed (rain); Rescheduled for February 20 ||  || 0–0 || Evans Diamond || 
|- align="center" bgcolor="#bbffbb"
| 1 || February 20 || Utah || 7–0 || #17 || E. Johnson (1–0) || R. Anton (0–1) || K. Miller (1) || 739 || 1–0 || Evans Diamond || W1
|- align="center" bgcolor="#bbffbb"
| 2 || February 20 || Utah || 6–5 || #17 || L. Scott (1–0) || J. Pond (0–1) ||  || 926 || 2–0 || Evans Diamond || W2
|- align="center" bgcolor="#ffbbbb"
| 3 || February 22 || @ #8 Stanford || 3–2 || #17 || J. Pries (1–0) || D. Anderson (0–1) ||  || 1,931 || 2–1 || Sunken Diamond || L1
|- align="center" bgcolor="#bbffbb"
| 4 || February 25 || @ Coastal Carolina || 17–0 || #17 || K. Miller (1–0) || A. Meo (0–1) ||  || 594 || 3–1 || Charles Watson Stadium || W1
|- align="center" bgcolor="#bbffbb"
| 5 || February 26 || North Carolina State || 4–0 || #17 || E. Johnson (2–0) || C. Mazzoni (1–1) || K. Porter (1) || 275 || 4–1 || Charles Watson Stadium || W2
|- align="center" bgcolor="#bbffbb"
| 6 || February 27 || Kansas State || 5–3 || #17 || J. Jones (1–0) || L. Schlick (0–1) ||  || 315 || 5–1 || Charles Watson Stadium || W3
|- 

|- align="center" bgcolor="#bbffbb"
| 7 || March 3 || @ San Diego || 5–3 || #14 || D. Anderson (1–1) || D. Covey (1–1) ||  || 263 || 6–1 || John Cunningham Stadium || W4
|- align="center" bgcolor="#ffbbbb"
| 8 || March 4 || @ San Diego State || 2–1 || #14 || E. Miller (1–1) || E. Johnson (2–1) || C. Rasmussen (1) || 503 || 6–2 || Tony Gwynn Stadium || L1
|- align="center" bgcolor="#ffbbbb"
| 9 || March 5 || #3 Oklahoma || 5–3 || #14 || B. Smith (2–0) || J. Jones (1–1) || J. Mayfield (3) || 327 || 6–3 || Tony Gwynn Stadium || L2
|- align="center" bgcolor="#ffbbbb"
| 10 || March 6 || #22 Connecticut || 3–1 || #14 || M. Barnes (1–2) || K. Miller (1–1) || K. Vance (1) || 218 || 6–4 || Tony Gwynn Stadium || L3
|- align="center" bgcolor="#bbffbb"
| 11 || March 8 || Santa Clara || 20–5 || #20 || L. Lechich (1–0) || J. Westerberg (0–1) ||  || 286 || 7–4 || Evans Diamond || W1
|- align="center" bgcolor="#bbffbb"
| 12 || March 11 || Louisiana-Lafayette || 7–6 || #20 || E. Johnson (3–1) || T. Hubbell (3–1) || M. Flemer (1) || 500 || 8–4 || AT&T Park || W2
|- align="center" bgcolor="#bbffbb"
| 13 || March 12 || #18 Rice || 7–6 (15) || #20 || K. Porter (1–0) || J. Chargois (0–2) ||  || 1,200 || 9–4 || AT&T Park || W3
|- align="center" bgcolor="#bbffbb"
| 14 || March 13 || Long Beach State || 6–1 || #20 || D. Anderson (2–1) || S. Stuart (2–1) ||  || 450 || 10–4 || AT&T Park || W4
|- align="center" bgcolor="#ffbbbb"
| 15 || March 16 || San Francisco || 7–6 (11) || #15 || A. Balog (2–0) || M. Flemer (0–1) ||  || 127 || 10–5 || Evans Diamond || L1
|- align="center" bgcolor="#bbbbbb"
|  || March 18 || Ohio State || colspan=5 |Postponed (rain); Rescheduled for March 19 ||  || 10–5 || Evans Diamond || 
|- align="center" bgcolor="#bbbbbb"
| 16 || March 19 || Ohio State || 4–0 || colspan=4 |Suspended (rain); Continued on March 20 ||  || 10–5 || Evans Diamond || 
|- align="center" bgcolor="#bbbbbb"
|  || March 19 || Ohio State || colspan=5 |Cancelled (rain) ||  || 10–5 || Evans Diamond || 
|- align="center" bgcolor="#bbffbb"
| 16 || March 20 || Ohio State || 4–0 || #15 || J. Jones (2–1) || D. Wolosiansky (1–2) ||  || 113 || 11–5 || Evans Diamond || W1
|- align="center" bgcolor="#bbffbb"
| 17 || March 20 || Ohio State || 11–1 || #15 || D. Anderson (3–1) || J. Kuchno (0–1) ||  || 113 || 12–5 || Evans Diamond || W2
|- align="center" bgcolor="#bbffbb"
| 18 || March 21 || Nevada || 2–0 || #16 || K. Miller (2–1) || M. Joukoff (1–4) || M. Flemer (2) || 120 || 13–5 || Evans Diamond || W3
|- align="center" bgcolor="#bbffbb"
| 19 || March 25 || Washington State || 7–0 || #16 || E. Johnson (4–1) || A. Conley (4–2) ||  || 142 || 14–5 || Evans Diamond || W4
|- align="center" bgcolor="#bbffbb"
| 20 || March 26 || Washington State || 3–0 || #16 || J. Jones (3–1) || J. Wise (2–2) || M. Flemer (3) || 136 || 15–5 || Evans Diamond || W5
|- align="center" bgcolor="#bbffbb"
| 21 || March 27 || Washington State || 4–3 (11) || #16 || M. Flemer (1–1) || B. DeRooy (1–2) ||  || 353 || 16–5 || Evans Diamond || W6
|- align="center" bgcolor="#bbffbb"
| 22 || March 29 || @ San Francisco || 4–0 || #13 || K. Miller (3–1) || A. Balog (2–1) ||  || 102 || 17–5 || Benedetti Diamond || W7
|- 

|- 

|- 

|- align="center" bgcolor="#ffbbbb"
| 1 || June 3 || Baylor || 6–4 || L. Verrett (7–5) || E. Johnson (6–4) || M. Garner (3) || 2,785 || 0–1 || Reckling Park || L1
|- align="center" bgcolor="#bbffbb"
| 2 || June 4 || Alcorn State || 10–6 || J. Jones (8–6) || T. Williams (7–6) ||  || 2,428 || 1–1 || Reckling Park || W1
|- align="center" bgcolor="#bbffbb"
| 3 || June 5 || Rice || 10–6 || M. Flemer (3–2) || T. Duffey (8–2) ||  || 2,391 || 2–1 || Reckling Park || W2
|- align="center" bgcolor="#bbffbb"
| 4 || June 5 || Baylor || 8–0 || K. Porter (5–0) || B. Pinckard (5–3) || J. Jones (1) || 2,411 || 3–1 || Reckling Park || W3
|- align="center" bgcolor="#bbffbb"
| 5 || June 6 || Baylor || 9–8 || M. Flemer (4–2) || L. Verrett (7–6) ||  || 2,213 || 4–1 || Reckling Park || W4
|- align="center" bgcolor="#bbffbb"
| 6 || June 11 || Dallas Baptist || 7–0 || J. Jones (9–6) || B. Williamson (10–4) ||  || 1,431 || 5–1 || Stephen Schott Stadium || W5
|- align="center" bgcolor="#bbffbb"
| 7 || June 12 || Dallas Baptist || 6–2 || E. Johnson (7–4) || J. Stafford (8–5) ||  || 1,431 || 6–1 || Stephen Schott Stadium || W6
|- 

|- align="center" bgcolor="#ffbbbb"
| 1 || June 19 || Virginia || 4–0 || T. Wilson (9–0) || L. Scott (1–2) || B. Kline (18) || 21,275 || 0–1 || TD Ameritrade Park Omaha || L1
|- align="center" bgcolor="#bbffbb"
| 2 || June 21 || Texas A&M || 7–3 || K. Porter (6–0) || M. Wacha (9–4) || M. Fleming (6) || 18,141 || 1–1 || TD Ameritrade Park Omaha || W1
|- align="center" bgcolor="#ffbbbb"
| 3 || June 21 || Virginia || 8–1 || T. Wilson (10–0) || D. Anderson (4–4) ||   || 25,833 || 1–2 || TD Ameritrade Park Omaha || L1
|-

Roster

Golden Bears in the 2011 MLB Draft
The following members of the California baseball program were drafted in the 2011 Major League Baseball Draft.

References

California Golden Bears baseball team, 2011
California Golden Bears baseball seasons
College World Series seasons
California Golden Bears baseball